The 2021–22 season was Akwa United's 26th season in the Nigerian football league system and their 13th (non-consecutive) season in the top tier of Nigerian football.

During the season, Akwa United participated in the Nigeria Professional Football League for the ninth consecutive season and the CAF Champions League, where they were eliminated by CR Belouizdad in the first round.

They began their Nigeria Professional Football League campaign with a home tie against  Kano Pillars, which they won 3-0.

First-team squad 

As of 18 July 2022

Management team

Competitions

Overview

Nigeria Professional Football League

League table

Results summary

Matches
On 24 November 2021, the fixtures for the forthcoming season were announced.

Nigeria FA Cup

Akwa United secured a place in the Aiteo Cup after beating Sir Monty to reach the final of the Akwa Ibom State FA Cup.

They entered the competition in the round of 64, and were drawn against Essien Ayi.

References 

Akwa United F.C.